Force Design 2030, also known as FD2030, is a force restructuring plan by the United States Marine Corps to reshape its combat power for future near-peer adversary conflicts.  It is designed to prepare the Marine Corps for a naval war against China. The plan's key goals are to modernize equipment, to work closer with the United States Navy and become more amphibious, to become more of a light strike force, and to better manage personal talents.

Modernize equipment
The Marine Corps understands that armies that do not constantly seek technological advances are at a disadvantage.  It has and will always seek out new ways to improve technology.  For example, it will be modifying its use of OPF's "Organic Precision Fires", a missile system that ranges in size from a mount on a vehicle to a mortar round that is carried by a Marine.  The Marine Corps is trying out having an OPF multi canister launcher, basically a medium-range missile launcher, on JLTV's, a more modern version of a Humvee.  They are also trying out the same system on ULTV's, a buggy-like 4-wheel caged car.  They will be giving each squad, a unit of about 13 Marines, 1-2 OPF's that are mannable by Marines.  

Another thing that the Marine Corps is doing is utilizing drone technology.  They believe that drones are the future and they are giving each organizational unit on the ground a drone.  The fire team, consisting of 4 Marines, gets a "Black Hornet" drone.  The squad, consisting of 13 Marines, gets a "Skydio" drone.  The platoon, consisting of 43 Marines, will receive a "FSkyRaider PQ-20B Puma".  A company, whose size may vary depending on what the job of the company is but will be around 150 Marines, will have a "Stalker Blk 30".  

The Marine Corps will also be making their Marines more lethal, and that starts with what they carry.  A squad of 13 Marines will be given a MAAWS weapon, a rocket launcher designed for anti-personnel use.  Every infantry squad in the US military normally has a SAW (squad automatic weapon), but the Marine Corps is modernizing that too.  They will give every squad a M27IAR or the next gen squad weapon if one comes out soon.  Just about every Marine with a rifle will get a suppressor for their weapon so that they can better hear their commander and be better protected from hearing loss.  Every Marine will also get a sidearm pistol.

Become more amphibious
The Marine Corps has always worked with the Navy, but, with the future threat being China, it needs to be closer to them.  The Marine Corps has drifted away from the Navy in recent engagements like the fight against ISIS, but it now needs to work closer and focus more on amphibious warfare.  It will not only need to work with the Navy but also the Coast Guard in the event of a war with China.  

One way the Corps is going to do this is institute a new type of regiment called a Littoral Regiment.  This regiment will be a naval formation that will be able to conduct fast strike missions.  A regiment will consist of a combat team, an anti-air battalion, and a logistics battalion.  It will debut in Hawaii, and each regiment will have 1800-2000 Marines and Sailors.  

Another new way the Corps will become more amphibious is that it will be using a new type of watercraft called Light Amphibious Warships or LAW's.  These crafts will mend the gap between the large, full scale Navy ships and the small landing crafts that were famous in WWII.

Become a strike force
The Marine Corps has been defined, at least in the past, as being the Navy's version of the Army.  However, now it is being defined as America's strike force.  To better fit this role, the Marine corps are making changes that make them more mobile and shift them away from the heavy infantry of the past and towards a high speed raid force.  To do this, the Marine Corps will shift resources away from heavy components like the infantry and towards flexible things like reconnaissance.  Below are some facts:

The Corps is reducing overall manpower by 12,000 Marines.  It plans to increase the Marine Infantry Course from 8 to 14 weeks so that these Marines can be more effective in raids.  It has divested of three military police battalions  and one regimental headquarters, bringing the total number to 7.  They will get rid of 3 active and 2 reserve infantry battalions, bringing the total numbers to 21 and 6, respectively.  They will also reduce the number of Marines in those battalions by about 200.  They will be shifting from cannon to rocket artillery by disbanding 16 cannon batteries, for a total of 5, and adding 14 rocket batteries, for a total of 21.  However, the biggest change is that they will get rid of all 7 tank companies, meaning that they will expect the army to provide all the tank power.  Of course, they will use this money to add 3 light armored reconnaissance companies for a total of 12.  They will also get rid of 2 assault amphibian companies, the landing force that leads the way, for a total of 4.  The Marines will also be utilizing "stand in forces" that get to a combat zone before the fighting starts.  

Of course, the airpower will also be changing.  The Corps will get rid of 10 active attack fighters per squadron.  The Corps will also get rid of 3 active tiltrotor, planes with two propellers on outstretched arms, squadrons for a total of 14.  They will be getting rid of 3 heavy lift helicopter squadrons for a total of 5.  They will get rid of 2 light attack helicopter squadrons for a remainder of 5.  They will be adding 1 aerial refueler squadrons for a total of 4.  They will also add 3 active unmanned aerial squadrons for a total of 6.  

It is clear that the Marines are going to have to rely on the Navy for more of their aircraft, but that is all a part of the plan.  

Another big change is that the Marines are trying to modernize the way that they organize their logistical components.  They will combine the dental and medical battalions into one Health Service Support Battalion.  They will also combine the Supply and Maintenance battalions into one Material Readiness Battalion.  They will combine the Transport Battalion and the Landing Support Battalion, a battalion that was previously not a part of logistics, into the Distribution Support Battalion as well.  They will increase the amount of Combat Logistics Battalions from 15 to 18.  The whole point of doing this is so they are packaged in a way that is easier to manage on the fly, making the Marines able to move from place to place quicker.  This will enable the type of fast and mobile warfare that the Marines are preparing for.

Personal talents
The Marine Corps is trying to revamp how they measure the worth of a Marine and how they use that worth.  They are making some changes about how they do this.  However, the biggest change is that they will be allowing people in certain fields like engineering to skip basic training and a few ranks.  The way this works is a man might have a degree or certain skill the Marine Corps is after.  The Marine Corps gives him "lateral entry" where he skips basic and comes in as maybe a sergeant instead of a private.  However, he is locked into that field and he cannot move out of that field for any reason.  So, a technician with lateral entry will not be commanding infantry Marines.  

The lateral entry is probably the biggest change, but there's more.  For starters, the Corps has already formed the Talent Management Strategy Group (TMX) to look after any talent management changes.  They have said that they will be having more emphasis on tests other than the ASVAB.  They will be a virtual talent marketplace, virtual reenlistments, and virtual review boards in order to circumvent the paper processes.

References

United States Marine Corps in the 21st century